The Mbam River is the largest tributary of the Sanaga River in Cameroon.
It flows from the Adamawa Plateau and receives the Kim and Ndjim rivers on its left bank and later the Noun River at its right bank before its confluence with the Sanaga River.

References

Rivers of Cameroon